Lecointe Island is an elongated island,  long between Cape Kaiser and Hvarchil Point,  wide and  high, separated from the east coast of Brabant Island by Pampa Passage, in the Palmer Archipelago, Antarctica.

The island was first roughly surveyed by the Belgian Antarctic Expedition, 1897–99, which gave the name Cape Kaiser to its northern extremity. The island was surveyed and photographed by several British expeditions, 1955–58, and was named by the Falkland Islands Dependencies Survey for Georges Lecointe, second-in-command and surveyor of the Belgian expedition which was responsible for the first survey of Gerlache Strait.

It is also known as Isla Kaiser and Isla Alice.

Maps
 Antarctic Digital Database (ADD). Scale 1:250000 topographic map of Antarctica. Scientific Committee on Antarctic Research (SCAR). Since 1993, regularly upgraded and updated.
British Antarctic Territory. Scale 1:200000 topographic map. DOS 610 Series, Sheet W 64 62. Directorate of Overseas Surveys, Tolworth, UK, 1980.
Brabant Island to Argentine Islands. Scale 1:250000 topographic map. British Antarctic Survey, 2008.

See also 
 Composite Antarctic Gazetteer
 List of Antarctic and sub-Antarctic islands
 List of Antarctic islands south of 60° S
 SCAR
 Territorial claims in Antarctica

References

External links 
 Lecointe Island on USGS website
 Lecointe Island on SCAR website
 Lecointe Island area satellite image
 Lecointe Island Copernix satellite image
 Lecointe Island area map

Islands of the Palmer Archipelago